Vujadin Subotić (born 18 December 1981) is a retired Montenegrin professional basketball player.

Professional career
During his playing days, he played for Budućnost, Slovenian teams Zagorje and Union Olimpija, Serbian teams OKK Beograd and Crvena zvezda, German teams Löwen Braunschweig and Alba Berlin, Cypriot teams AEL Limassol, Keravnos, and AEK Larnaca, Romanian teams CSM Oradea and SCM Timișoara, and a Slovak team Inter Bratislava. He retired as a player with Inter Bratislava in 2016.

Career achievements 
Source
 Adriatic League champion: 1  (with Union Olimpija: 2001–02)
 Premier Slovenian League champion: 1  (with Union Olimpija: 2001–02)
 Cyprus Division A champion: 1  (with AEK Larnaca: 2012–13)
 Serbian Cup winner: 1  (with Crvena zvezda: 2005–06)
 Slovenian Cup winner: 1  (with Union Olimpija: 2001–02)
 Cypriot Cup winner: 1  (with Keravnos: 2009–10)
 Slovak Cup winner: 1  (with Inter Bratislava: 2015–16)

See also 
 List of KK Crvena zvezda players with 100 games played

References

External links
Vujadin Subotic at eurobasket.com
Vujadin Subotic at euroleague.net
Vujadin Subotic at proballers.com
Vujadin Subotic at realgm.com

1981 births
Living people
ABA League players
AEL Limassol B.C. players
Alba Berlin players
Basketball League of Serbia players
BK Inter Bratislava players
CSM Oradea (basketball) players
Keravnos B.C. players
KK Crvena zvezda players
KK Budućnost players
KK Olimpija players
Montenegrin expatriate basketball people in Germany
Montenegrin expatriate basketball people in Romania
Montenegrin expatriate basketball people in Serbia
Montenegrin expatriate basketball people in Slovakia
Montenegrin men's basketball players
OKK Beograd players
People from Kotor
Small forwards